Guy Forget and Henri Leconte were the defending champions but only Leconte competed that year with Eric Winogradsky.

Leconte and Winogradsky lost in the quarterfinals to Heinz Günthardt and Balázs Taróczy.

Ricki Osterthun and Udo Riglewski won in the final 7–6, 6–7, 6–1 against Günthardt and Taróczy.

Seeds
Champion seeds are indicated in bold text while text in italics indicates the round in which those seeds were eliminated.

 Claudio Panatta /  Tomáš Šmíd (first round)
 Heinz Günthardt /  Balázs Taróczy (final)
 Jan Gunnarsson /  Michael Mortensen (quarterfinals)
 Mark Koevermans /  Tom Nijssen (first round)

Draw

External links
 Doubles draw

Doubles